Never is the second studio album by Micachu and the Shapes. It was released through Rough Trade Records on 23 July 2012.

Critical reception
At Metacritic, which assigns a weighted average score out of 100 to reviews from mainstream critics, the album received an average score of 76% based on 24 reviews, indicating "generally favorable reviews".

Accolades

Track listing

Personnel
 Micachu and the Shapes – performance
 Micachu – mixing
 Wesley Gonzalez – vocals (on "Nothing")
 Dilip Harris – recording, mixing

References

External links
 

2012 albums
Micachu albums
Rough Trade Records albums
Experimental pop albums